New Voices is an award for emerging composers made by the Celtic Connections festival annually since 1998. It is a musical commission which enables recipients to compose and perform a significant new suite of music of about forty-five minutes, based on traditional themes. Usually there are three commissions each year, with each composer performing their work at a lunchtime concert on one of the three Sundays of the festival. The funding provides for the musician both to develop the work, and to direct its performance, typically by five to ten musicians, at its première. In the earlier years, the composer was invited to further develop the work and revisit it at the festival the next year, but this is no longer practised. 

The selection process for the commissions is informal. Sometimes a musician may approach the festival with an idea for a new work, other times festival director Donald Shaw proposes participation to a musician he thinks would benefit and create something worthwhile.

Various sponsors have supported New Voices over the years. In 2020 the awards were sponsored by the Scottish edition of The Times and Sunday Times, and the composers were Marit Fält, Pàdruig Morrison and Catriona Price.

New Voices commissions
All of the concerts were premières unless otherwise noted.

Notes

References

Commissioned music
British music awards
Scottish awards
Awards established in 1998
Early career awards
Annual events in Glasgow